is a Japanese freestyle skier. He competed in the men's aerials event at the 2002 Winter Olympics.

References

1972 births
Living people
Japanese male freestyle skiers
Olympic freestyle skiers of Japan
Freestyle skiers at the 2002 Winter Olympics
People from Suita
21st-century Japanese people